(Lord, as you will, so let it be done with me), 73, is a church cantata by Johann Sebastian Bach. He composed it for the third Sunday after Epiphany and first performed it in Leipzig on 23 January 1724. It was probably composed shortly before the first performance.

History and words 
Bach arrived in Leipzig in 1723. He set about composing a series of cantatas for performance in the city's principal churches through the liturgical year. This one was written for the Third Sunday after Epiphany. The prescribed readings for the Sunday were taken from the Epistle to the Romans, rules for life, and from the Gospel of Matthew, the healing of a leper. The unknown poet takes the words of the leper "Lord, if thou wilt, thou canst make me clean" as a starting point and recommends his attitude of trust for the situation of facing death. In the first movement he contrasts lines of Kaspar Bienemann's chorale "" with three sections of recitative. Movement 3 paraphrases . The words of movement 4 are the leper's words from the Gospel. The closing chorale is the final stanza of Ludwig Helmbold's hymn "".

Bach first performed the cantata on 23 January 1724, and performed it again in a revised version on 21 January 1748 or 26 January 1749.

The music was published in 1870 as part of the Bach-Gesellschaft-Ausgabe, an edition of the composer's complete works. The editor was Wilhelm Rust.

Scoring and structure 
The cantata in five movements is scored for soprano, tenor  and bass soloists, a four-part choir, horn (replaced by organ in the revised version), two oboes, two violins, viola, and basso continuo.

 Chorus and recitative (tenor, bass, soprano): 
 Aria (tenor): 
 Recitative (bass): 
 Aria (bass): 
 Chorale:

Music 
The opening chorus is based on the first stanza of the hymn "Herr, wie du willt, so schicks mit mir", which is expanded by recitatives of the three soloists. A four-note motif on the words "" is introduced by the horn and repeated throughout the movement. The accompagnato recitatives for all soloists are accompanied by the oboes with material from the ritornello, while the horn and the strings continue the motif. In the final repeat of the ritornello the choir sings the motif, and repeats it in a final "cadenza".

In movement 3 the will of man is described as "" (quickly contrary, quickly dashed), illustrated in the melody. Movement 4 begins without a ritornello. The unusual three stanzas, all beginning with the words "", are delivered as free variations and closed by a coda. Similar to movement 1, a motif on "" opens and is repeated throughout the movement, finally in the coda. This motif is the beginning of the famous aria Bist du bei mir from the Notebook for Anna Magdalena Bach, long attributed to Bach, but written by Gottfried Heinrich Stölzel.

The melody of the closing chorale (with the incipit "Das ist des Vaters Wille") is based on the French popular song "Une jeune fillette".

Recordings 

 Bach Made in Germany Vol. 1 – Cantatas II, Günther Ramin, Thomanerchor, Gewandhausorchester, soprano soloist of the Thomanerchor, Hans-Joachim Rotzsch, Hans Hauptmann, Eterna 1954
 Die Bach Kantate Vol. 23, Helmuth Rilling, Figuralchor der Gedächtniskirche Stuttgart, Bach-Collegium Stuttgart, Magdalene Schreiber, Adalbert Kraus, Wolfgang Schöne, Hänssler 1971
 J. S. Bach: Das Kantatenwerk – Sacred Cantatas Vol. 4, Gustav Leonhardt, Knabenchor Hannover, Collegium Vocale Gent, Gewandhausorchester, soprano soloist of the Knabenchor Hannover, Kurt Equiluz, Max van Egmond, Teldec 1977
 J. S. Bach: Cantatas, Philippe Herreweghe, Collegium Vocale Gent, Barbara Schlick, Howard Crook, Peter Kooy, Virgin Classics 1990
 J. S. Bach: Complete Cantatas Vol. 10, Ton Koopman, Amsterdam Baroque Orchestra & Choir, Caroline Stam, Paul Agnew, Klaus Mertens, Antoine Marchand 1998
 J. S. Bach: Cantatas for the 3rd Sunday of Epiphany, John Eliot Gardiner, Monteverdi Choir, English Baroque Soloists, Joanne Lunn, Julian Podger, Stephen Varcoe, Archiv Produktion 2000
 J. S. Bach: Cantatas Vol. 17, Masaaki Suzuki, Bach Collegium Japan, Yukari Nonoshita, Gerd Türk, Peter Kooy, BIS 2002
 J. S. Bach: Cantatas for the Complete Liturgical Year Vol. 8, Sigiswald Kuijken, La Petite Bande, Gerlinde Sämann, Petra Noskaiová, Christoph Genz, Jan van der Crabben, Accent 2008

References

Sources 
 
 Herr, wie du willt, so schicks mit mir BWV 73; BC A 35 / Sacred cantata (3rd Sunday of Epiphany) Bach Digital
 Cantata BWV 73 Herr, wie du willt, so schicks mit mir history, scoring, sources for text and music, translations to various languages, discography, discussion, Bach Cantatas Website
 BWV 73 Herr, wie du willt, so schicks mit mir English translation, University of Vermont
 BWV 73 Herr, wie du willt, so schicks mit mir text, scoring, University of Alberta
 Luke Dahn: BWV 73.5 bach-chorales.com

Church cantatas by Johann Sebastian Bach
1724 compositions